The Tucker Farm Historic District is a historic district in Dartmouth, Massachusetts.  It encompasses a farm property which has been worked since the 17th century, and several houses, one of which may have a portion dating to the ownership of Henry Tucker, the land's first English settler.  It also includes a remnant of what was once a major Native trail and public right of way connecting Plymouth, Massachusetts, and Newport, Rhode Island.

The district was listed on the National Register of Historic Places in 1988.

See also
National Register of Historic Places listings in Bristol County, Massachusetts

References

Historic districts in Bristol County, Massachusetts
Dartmouth, Massachusetts
National Register of Historic Places in Bristol County, Massachusetts
Historic districts on the National Register of Historic Places in Massachusetts
Farms on the National Register of Historic Places in Massachusetts